Elwala or Elavaala is a village in the southern state of Karnataka, India. It is located in the Mysore taluk of Mysore district in Karnataka.

Demographics
 India census, Elwala had a population of 8327 with 4198 males and 4129 females.

See also
 Mysore
 Districts of Karnataka

References

External links

Villages in Mysore district